A general election was held in the U.S. state of Wyoming on Tuesday, November 6, 1934. All of the state's executive officers—the Governor, Secretary of State, Auditor, Treasurer, and Superintendent of Public Instruction—were up for election. In the 1932 gubernatorial special election, the Democratic candidate, Leslie A. Miller, won and ran for re-election for a full term in 1934. The Democratic Party also won elections for Secretary of State, Auditor, Treasurer, and Superintendent of Public Instruction, flipping those offices from the Republican Party.

Governor

Incumbent Democratic Governor Leslie A. Miller, first elected in the 1932 special election, ran for re-election to his second term and his first full term. He defeated Republican Secretary of State Alonzo M. Clark, who had acted as governor during the vacancy.

Secretary of State
Incumbent Secretary of State Alonzo M. Clark opted to run for Governor rather than seek re-election, creating an open seat. State Representative Lester C. Hunt won the Democratic primary over fellow State Representative Pat Flannery and faced State Senator Clifford A. Miller in the general election. Hunt defeated Miller by a wide margin, flipping control of the office to the Democratic Party for the first time since 1914.

Democratic primary

Candidates
 Lester C. Hunt, State Representative from Fremont County
 Pat Flannery, State Representative from Goshen County

Results

Republican primary

Candidates
 Clifford A. Miller, State Senator from Natrona County
 Clarence Gardner, State Senator from Lincoln County
 Fred E. Holdredge, former State Representative from Hot Springs County
 W. C. DeLoney, State Senator from Teton County

Results

General election

Results

Auditor
Incumbent Republican Auditor Roscoe Alcorn ran for re-election to a third term, and a second full term following his appointment in 1929. He once again faced accountant C. H. Reimerth in the Republican primary, whom he easily defeated. In the general election, he faced William M. Jack, the Speaker of the Wyoming House of Representatives. Aided by the Democratic landslide in Wyoming, Jack easily defeated Alcorn.

Democratic primary

Candidates
 William M. Jack, Speaker of the Wyoming House of Representatives

Results

Republican primary

Candidates
 Roscoe Alcorn, incumbent State Auditor
 C. H. Reimerth, accountant, 1930 Republican candidate for Auditor

Results

General election

Results

Treasurer
Incumbent Republican State Treasurer Harry Weston was unable to seek re-election due to term limits, and Weston opted to retire rather than seek another office. Casper City Treasurer Charles A. Cullen won the Republican primary and faced Democratic nominee J. Kirk Baldwin, the former state airport supervisor, and Communist Party nominee Don Wirth in the general election. Baldwin defeated Cullen in a landslide.

Democratic primary

Candidates
 J. Kirk Baldwin, former state airport supervisor
 A. E. Wilde, State Examiner, former State Representative from Lincoln County

Results

Republican primary

Candidates
 Charles A. Cullen, Casper City Treasurer
 F. G. Huffman, former State Representative from Platte County
 Hans Hansen, former State Representative from Big Horn County

Results

General election

Results

Superintendent of Public Instruction
Incumbent Republican Superintendent of Public Instruction Katharine A. Morton ran for re-election to a fifth term. She faced several challengers in the Republican primary and won renomination with a plurality. In the general election, she faced Jack R. Gage, who won the Democratic primary with less than 20% of the vote. Gage was able to take advantage of the Democratic landslide in Wyoming and defeated Morton with more than 60% of the vote, a significant reversal from Morton's past electoral successes.

Democratic primary

Candidates
 Jack R. Gage, Sheridan teacher
 Maude Sholty, State Director of Special Education
 Gilbert E. Johnson
 Ida M. B. Anderson, 
 Elmer J. Halseth, Rock Springs teacher
 M. A. Thrasher, Platte County Commissioner, member of the University of Wyoming Board of Trustees

Results

Republican primary

Candidates
 Katharine A. Morton, incumbent Superintendent of Instruction
 H. T. Emmett, Wahaskie County Superintendent of Schools
 Clare E. Ausherman, former Wyoming State Librarian

Results

General election

Results

References

 
Wyoming